Abdrakhmanovo is the name of several rural localities in Russia:
Abdrakhmanovo, Aurgazinsky District, Bashkortostan, a derevnya in Tukaevsky Rural Settlement of Aurgazinsky District in the Bashkortostan
Abdrakhmanovo, Baymaksky District, Bashkortostan, a derevnya in Tatlybaevsky Rural Settlement of Baymaksky District in the Bashkortostan
Abdrakhmanovo, Orenburg Oblast, a selo in Abdrakhmanovskoe Rural Settlement of Abdulinsky District in the Orenburg Oblast
Abdrakhmanovo, Sarmanovsky District, Tatarstan, a posyolok in Jalil settlement of Sarmanovsky District in the Tatarstan; 
Abdrakhmanovo, Sterlitamaksky District, Bashkortostan, a derevnya in Pervomayskiy Rural Settlement of Sterlitamaksky District in the Tatarstan
Abdrakhmanovo, Tatarstan, a selo in Abdrakhmanovskoe Rural Settlement of Almetyevsky District in the Tatarstan